John de Beauchamp, 3rd Baron Beauchamp de Somerset (20 January 1329 – 8 October 1361) was an English peer.

Origins
He was born at Stoke-sub-Hamdon in Somerset, the eldest son and heir of John de Beauchamp, 2nd Baron Beauchamp of Hatch Beauchamp in Somerset by his wife Margaret St. John.

Career
He was Warden of the Cinque Ports from 1359 to about 1361.
King Edward III issued a commission to Beauchamp from 1359 to act as Warden and Keeper of the Ports of Kent. In 1359 he participated in the expedition to Gascony by King Edward III. In 1360 he was appointed Admiral of the Fleet.

Marriage
He married Lady Alice Beauchamp, daughter of Sir Thomas de Beauchamp, 11th Earl of Warwick (who was no relation to the Beauchamp family of Hatch) by his wife Katherine Mortimer. The marriage was without progeny.

References 

"John Beauchamp, 3rd Lord Beauchamp (of Somerset)", The Peerage, 12 May 2007. Accessed 18 February 2009
Burke, Bernard. A Genealogical History of the Dormant, Abeyant, Forfeited and Extinct Peerages of the British Empire. London: Harrison, 1866.(p. 33) googlebooks Retrieved 22 February 2009

External links
Beauchamps

1329 births
1361 deaths
Lords Warden of the Cinque Ports
14th-century English people
Barons in the Peerage of England
John